Allesley  is a village and civil parish in the City of Coventry metropolitan borough, West Midlands, about 4 miles (5.25 km) west-northwest of Coventry city centre and 4 miles (6.5 km) east-south-east of Meriden. According to the 2001 census, the parish had a population of 805, which rose to 837 at the 2011 Census (excluding the neighbouring districts of Allesley Park and Allesley Green). Until 1998, Allesley contained the main Jaguar car assembly plant at Browns Lane.

The parish

Situated at the eastern extreme of the Meriden Gap, the parish of Allesley covers a much larger area than the village itself, which is based around Washbrook Lane, Browns Lane and Hawkesmill Lane. The parish incorporates the ancient rural Ardens of Pinketts Booth, Pickford, Pickford Green, Harvest Hill, Hawkes End, Hollyberry End, Wall Hill and Brownshill Green.

Allesley Village denotes the area east of the Birmingham Road, including West Point. Although this is largely a dormitory community for Coventry, it retains several aspects of a separate village, with many residents still regarding it as such. Most of the old village is a conservation area on a low ridge between the River Sherbourne and a tributary of it, the Pickford Brook.

The suburbs of Allesley Green and Allesley Park lie to the south and west. Allesley Park developed in the 1950s to 1970s to the east of the A45 and due south of Allesley. Allesley Green, built in the late 1980s, lies a quarter of a mile south-west of Allesley. The combined population of the three main districts is approximately 8,000.

History

Allesley grew around the 800-year-old All Saints Church (known as All Souls Church until the Reformation). Its spire is prominent on the village skyline. Originating about 1140, it was rebuilt in 1863 and remains largely unaltered since. A noted writer on husbandry, Walter Blith, was baptised there on 7 August 1605.

The Birmingham Road running through the village was part of the turnpike trunk road laid out between Holyhead and London in 1821–1824 by Thomas Telford. A toll house stood at the junction of Holyhead Road and Allesley Old Road, but the tolls were withdrawn by Act of Parliament in 1871 and the toll house demolished in the mid-1930s.

Allesley included the Browns Lane Jaguar car plant and its national showroom, which closed in the late 1990s. Wood-veneer trim production for Jaguar continued until the mid-2000s, after which the land was sold to developers. An Amazon fulfilment centre is now one of the businesses on the site.

Twin town

Allesley is twinned with the village of Saint-Jean-Soleymieux, near Saint-Etienne, Loire, France.

Sports
The parish has an amateur Barkers Butts Rugby Football Club playing at the Bob Coward Memorial Ground, just off Pickford Grange Lane. Formed in 1946, it originally played in Keresley, but moved to Allesley in 1975.

References

Bibliography
David Fry and Albert Smith, 1991/1993, The Coventry We Have Lost. 2 vols, Simanda Press, Berkswell /

Villages in the West Midlands (county)
Suburbs of Coventry
Civil parishes in the West Midlands (county)
Conservation areas in England